Excursion in the Countryside of Infanta Isabel Clara Eugenia (Spanish: Excursión campestre de Isabel Clara Eugenia) is an oil on canvas painting by Flemish artists Jan Brueghel the Elder and Joos de Momper. It was painted in the first quarter of the 17th century, and is housed at the Museum of Prado, in Madrid.

Painting
This landscape painting depicts Archduchess Isabel Clara Eugenia in the fields of her summer residence in Mariemont, close by Brussels. Isabella's opulent palace is visible in the upper right corner.

In the foreground, there are several people raking up hay, loading it onto a cart. The painting portraits people engaged in common activities typical of the country. However, the workers in the painting are in fact members of the court. Among them, there is Isabel. The oeuvre is an allegory for the enjoyment of the life/ time spent in the country.

Isabel's love and enthusiasm for the life in the country is evinced in her correspondence with the Duke of Lerma. For example. in a letter she wrote on October 20, 1606, the archduchess says: "[A] todos nos da la vida el exercicio y el andar al campo." In another letter, dating to May 29, 1609, she writes: "[N]os hemos venido a esta casilla a gozar del campo, que esta lindísimo [...]. En fin, la vida en el campo es la mejor de todas."

The painting is considered a collaboration between Joos de Momper and Jan Brueghel the Elder. The latter reportedly painted the figures, the former the landscape. The painting was part of a group of twenty-six paintings which reached Madrid from Flanders in the early 17th century. The paintings were to decorate the Torre de la Reina in the Alcázar de Madrid. The  Excursion in the countryside of Infanta Isabel Clara Eugenia is first mentioned in an inventory of the Alcázar dating to 1636.

References

Further reading
 Díaz Padrón, Matías, Museo del Prado: catálogo de pinturas. Escuela flamenca, Museo del Prado; Patrimonio Nacional de Museos, Madrid, 1975, pp. 201–202.
 Crawford Volk, Mary, Rubens in Madrid & the decoration of the king's summer apartments, THE BURLINGTON MAGAZINE, 123, 1981, pp. 513–529.
 Díaz Padrón, Matías, El siglo de Rubens en el Museo del Prado: catálogo razonado, II, Prensa Ibérica, Barcelona, 1995, pp. 248.
 Vergara, Alejandro, Rubens and his Spanish patrons, Cambridge University Press, Cambridge, 1999, pp. 28–32.
 Vergara, Alejandro, The Presence of Rubens in Spain. (Volumes i and II). Tesis D, A Bell & Howell Company, Ann Arbor, 1999, pp. 18–20.
 Ertz, Klaus, Jan Brueghel der Ältere (1568-1625). Kritischer katalog der..., III, Luca Verlag, 2008, pp. 1217–1219.
 Díaz Padrón, Matías, El lienzo de Vertumno y Pomona de Rubens y los cuartos bajos de verano del Alcázar de Madrid, Rubens Picture Ltd., 2009, pp. 58.
 Posada Kubissa, Teresa, El paisaje nórdico en el Prado. Rubens, Brueghel, Lorena, Museo Nacional del Prado, Madrid, 2011, pp. 88–95.
 Pérez Preciado, José Juan, 'Reyes Gobernadores, Nobles, Funcionarios y Artistas. La incesante llegada de obas de arte a España desde los Paises Bajos en el s.XVII', Aragón y Flandes. Un encuentro artístico (siglos XV-XVII), Universidad de Zaragoza, Zaragoza, 2015, pp. 132–142 [134].

External links
Excursión campestre de Isabel Clara Eugenia at the Museum of Prado

1620s paintings
Paintings of the Museo del Prado by Flemish artists
Landscape paintings
Paintings by Joos de Momper
Paintings by Jan Brueghel the Elder